Rob Milligan (born February 6, 1971) is a former politician in Ontario, Canada. He was a Progressive Conservative member of the Legislative Assembly of Ontario from 2011 to 2014. He represented the riding of Northumberland—Quinte West.

Background
Milligan grew up in Warkworth, Ontario in the municipality of Trent Hills. He taught History and English at Campbellford District High School from 1998 until his election to the legislature. He is married with two young daughters and operates a small beef farm.

Politics
In the 2011 provincial election he ran as the Progressive Conservative candidate in the riding of Northumberland—Quinte West. He defeated Liberal incumbent Lou Rinaldi by 707 votes. In the 2014 election he was in rematch with Rinaldi but this time lost to him by 3,887 votes.

During his tenure in parliament, he served as critic for interprovincial trade and education issues.

In September 2017, Milligan sought the Progressive Conservative nomination for the new riding of Northumberland—Peterborough South. Milligan lost the nomination to David Piccini on September 23, 2017.

Electoral record

References

External links

1971 births
Living people
People from Northumberland County, Ontario
Progressive Conservative Party of Ontario MPPs
21st-century Canadian politicians